George Gregory Glamack (June 7, 1919 – March 10, 1987) was an American professional basketball player.

Biography
Born in Johnstown, Pennsylvania, he was of Serbian origin.

A 6'6" forward-center, Glamack attended the University of North Carolina at Chapel Hill. Glamack, an All-American in 1940 and 1941, was nicknamed the Blind Bomber because he had very poor eyesight and had to rely on the lines drawn on the court when shooting. The Spaulding Guide noted that "Glamack, who is ambididextrous when on the court, is also so nearsighted that the ball is merely a dim object, but apparently he never looked where he was shooting, depending upon his sense of distance and direction." The secret of "The Blind Bomber" was looking at the black lines on the court. By doing that he knew where he was in reference to the basket and measure the shot.

He scored 45 points against Clemson in 1941, still the fourth-highest total in UNC history. That year, he led UNC to a Southern Conference championship and the NCAA tournament. In both 1940 and 1941 he won the Helms Foundation Player of the Year which was the only MVP award of that time.  He is one of eight players to have his jersey number retired by UNC, the others being Jack Cobb, Lennie Rosenbluth, Phil Ford, James Worthy, Michael Jordan, Antawn Jamison, and Tyler Hansbrough.

Glamack entered pro basketball in 1941. In 1945 he joined the Rochester Royals of the National Basketball League. Glamack scored a team high 12.3 points per game and the team finished with a record of 24–10. They would go on to win the 1946 championship, defeating the Sheboygan Red Skins 3–0. The next year Glamack scored 8.5 points per game and the team finished with a record of 31–13, the best record in the league. The team went to the finals again in 1947 but lost to George Mikan and the Chicago American Gears. Glamack retired from professional basketball in 1951.

BAA career statistics

Regular season

References

External links

1919 births
1987 deaths
Akron Goodyear Wingfoots players
All-American college men's basketball players
American men's basketball players
American people of Serbian descent
Basketball players from Pennsylvania
Centers (basketball)
Hammond Calumet Buccaneers players
Indianapolis Jets players
Indianapolis Kautskys players
North Carolina Tar Heels men's basketball players
Power forwards (basketball)
Rochester Royals players
Sportspeople from Johnstown, Pennsylvania